Ruth Elizabeth Rouse (born January 30, 1963, Parish of St. David, Grenada) is a diplomat who served as the Grenadian Permanent Representative to the United Nations, High Commissioner to the UK, and Non-Resident High Commissioner to the Republic of South Africa.  In January 2020, she was named Secretary to the Grenada Cabinet.

She earned an MA in diplomatic studies from the University of Westminster in the United Kingdom and a BA in French and Spanish from Carleton University in Canada.

References

High Commissioners of Grenada to the United Kingdom
Permanent Representatives of Grenada to the United Nations
Women ambassadors
1963 births
Living people
Alumni of the University of Westminster
Carleton University alumni